Choroba may refer to:

 Choroba or Choruba, a dialect of the Gonja language
 Choroba (surname)

See also